Hikawa can refer to:

Places
Hikawa, Kumamoto, a town in Kumamoto, Japan
Hikawa, Shimane, a former town in Shimane, Japan
Hikawa District, Shimane, a former district in Shimane, Japan
Hikawa Shrine, one of two Japanese shrines:
Hikawa Shrine (Saitama)
Hikawa Shrine (Akasaka)

Other uses 
 Hikawa (surname)
 Hikawa Maru class ocean liner of Japan
 Hikawa Maru, ocean liner launched in 1929 and opened as a museum ship in 2008